Lindblad is a surname of Swedish origin which may refer to:

People 
Adolf Fredrik Lindblad, (1801–1878), Swedish composer
Alessandro Lindblad (Alesso) (born 1991), Swedish DJ and producer
Bertil Lindblad (1895–1965), Swedish astronomer
Göran Lindblad (physicist), (born 1940), Swedish theoretical physicist
Göran Lindblad (politician), (born 1950), Swedish politician, Member of Parliament
Hanna Lindblad (born 1980), Swedish singer
Henry Lindblad (1906–1946), Swedish athlete
Jan Lindblad (1932–1987), Swedish naturalist, writer, photographer
Kerstin Lindblad-Toh, Swedish scientist
Lars Lindblad, (born 1971), Swedish politician
Lars-Eric Lindblad (1927–1994), Swedish-American entrepreneur and explorer
Otto Lindblad, (1809–1864) Swedish composer of Kungssången, the Swedish royal anthem
Paul Lindblad (1941–2000), American baseball player
Rune Lindblad (1923-1991), Swedish composer of musique concrète

Sciences 
Lindblad equation, in quantum mechanics, the most general type of Markov master equation
Lindblad resonance, in astronomy, a type of orbital resonance in galactic disks and planetary rings

Location 
Lindblad (crater), an old lunar crater on the far side of the Moon, just beyond the northwestern limb.

Ship 
MS Lindblad Explorer, Liberian-registered cruise ship designed for Arctic and Antarctic service, originally commissioned and operated by the Swedish explorer Lars-Eric Lindblad

Swedish-language surnames